James Cuffey (October 8, 1911 – May 30, 1999) was an American astronomer.  He specialized in photoelectric photometry and held the patent on the Cuffey Iris Photometer, an instrument used in stellar photographic photometry.

Born in Chicago, Illinois, Cuffey became a graduate student at Northwestern University in 1934, then went on to Harvard University as a doctoral student under Harlow Shapley. He received his Ph.D. from Harvard in 1938, then took a position as a postdoctoral fellow at Indiana University.  Serving in the United States Navy in World War II, Cuffey taught navigation at the U.S. Naval Academy.  In 1946, he returned to Indiana University, where he became a researcher in the Indiana Asteroid Program, begun in 1949. In 1966, he joined Clyde Tombaugh in starting the astronomy program at New Mexico State University, where he remained until he retired in 1976.

Cuffey was married to astronomer Rita Paraboschi.  They had four children. Cuffey died in Bloomington, Indiana.  The asteroid 2334 Cuffey is named in his honor.

Notes and references

Beebe, H.A., Obituary: James Cuffey, 1911-1999, Bulletin of the American Astronomical Society, vol. 32, no. 4, p. 1658-1659.
Ken Kingery, Betting on a Sure Thing: A "Record" Ending to Indiana Asteroid Program, Indiana Alumni Magazine, v.1, no. 2, September/October 2008, Bloomington, IN: Indiana University Alumni Association, pp. 46–47.
Space Daily, April 8, 2008.

External links
Note on James Cuffey's observations of Messier 71

1911 births
1999 deaths
Scientists from Chicago
20th-century American astronomers
Northwestern University alumni
Harvard University alumni
Indiana University faculty
United States Naval Academy faculty
New Mexico State University faculty
20th-century American inventors